is a Japanese professional shogi player ranked 5-dan.

Early life
Miyamoto was born in Kamitonda, Wakayama on January 27, 1986. He learned how to play shogi from his father when he was a first-grade elementary school student, and eventually entered the Japan Shogi Association's apprentice school at the rank of 6-kyū under the guidance of shogi professional  in 1999.

Miyamoto was promoted to the rank of 1-dan in 2003 and then 3-dan in 2005. He entered the 37th 3-dan League (April 2005September 2005), but his progress slowed and he was unable to secure full professional status and the rank of 4-dan until he tied for first place in the 54th 3-dan League with a record of 13 wins and 5 losses.

Promotion history
Miyamoto's promotion is as follows:
 6-kyū: September 1999  
 3-dan: April 2005
 4-dan: April 1, 2014
 5-dan: March 3, 2016

References

External links
ShogiHub: Professional Player Info · Miyamoto, Hiroshi

Japanese shogi players
Living people
Professional shogi players
Professional shogi players from Wakayama Prefecture
1986 births